Tommy Hays (born Thomas Avery Hays in Hartshorne, Oklahoma, in 1929) is a guitarist, band leader and vocalist; and is one of the last living members of the great musicians who created The Bakersfield Sound.  

He started playing the guitar in church when he was 10 years old. He performed on the Billy Mize TV Show, Cousin Herb Show, was a member of the house band for the Lucky Spot and the Blackboard and had his own radio show on KMPC. Tommy played on stage with many of the old timers who were part of creating the Bakersfield Sound. Tommy was in the band that gave Buck Owens his first gig, with Dusty Rhodes, at a bar called the Roundup.

Tommy has been playing in the honky-tonks in and around Bakersfield for over fifty years. Recognized as one of the original “Bakersfield Sound” pioneers, he has helped forge this unique and definitive sound. Driven by the piano, steel and Telecaster guitar, the Bakersfield Sound was a reaction to the early ‘50s and ‘60s sweetening of country music epitomized by the Nashville Sound.

Along with the Western Swingsters which also included Big Bill Wilkerson, he released the  CD 60 Years of Western Swing in 2006.

Tommy was inducted into the Western Swing Society Hall of Fame in 2010.

He currently resides in Bakersfield, California, and still plays locally.

Discography
60 Years of Western Swing (2006)

References

External links
Echoes of Bakersfield, an informational archive site.
Article about the Bakersfield Sound, Tales and Reflections.
Another Bakersfield Sound article Totally Explained.
Walking the Floor with Chris Shiflett Tommy Hays about his life and the golden age of the Bakersfield Sound
KERO 23 article Two Legends Play At Crystal Palace
BillyMizeMovie.com Coming to a Palace near you: The Billy Mize film

Musicians from Bakersfield, California
1929 births
Living people
People from Hartshorne, Oklahoma